Just a Bugler (Swedish: Bara en trumpetare) is a 1938 Swedish comedy film directed by Anders Henrikson and starring Adolf Jahr, Elof Ahrle and Sickan Carlsson. It was shot at the Råsunda Studios in Stockholm and on location at Gripsholm Castle. The film's sets were designed by the art director Arne Åkermark.

Synopsis
A bugler serving in the Swedish army has both romantic and musical ambitions. He also has a lengthy dream imagining he is fighting in the army of Charles XII in the early eighteenth century.

Cast
 Adolf Jahr as Adolf Berg
 Elof Ahrle as 	Loffe
 Sickan Carlsson as 	Gertrud Brinkman 
 Gustaf Lövås as 	Putte
 Katie Rolfsen as 	Svea Hjorth
 Carl Hagman as 	Brinkman 
 Karin Albihn as 	Stina Brinkman
 Weyler Hildebrand as 	Göransson
 Emy Hagman as 	Augusta
 Nils Ericsson as 	Gottfried 
 Carin Swensson as 	Karin 
 Bror Bügler as	Lt. Braune
 Elsa Jahr as Anna, cook
 Douglas Håge as 	Berg
 John Botvid as Usher 
 Åke Grönberg as Ensign musician 
 Anders Henrikson as Colonel

References

Bibliography 
 Qvist, Per Olov & von Bagh, Peter. Guide to the Cinema of Sweden and Finland. Greenwood Publishing Group, 2000.

External links 
 

1938 films
Swedish comedy films
1938 comedy films
1930s Swedish-language films
Films directed by Anders Henrikson
Swedish black-and-white films
1930s Swedish films